P13 may refer to:

Aircraft 
 Aviatik P.13, a German reconnaissance biplane
 Lippisch P.13, a German experimental bomber
 Thomas-Morse XP-13 Viper, an American experimental biplane fighter

Transport 
 Highway P13 (Ukraine), now numbered H28
 London Buses route P13
 P13 Road (Zimbabwe)
 San Carlos Apache Airport, in Gila County, Arizona, United States

Other uses 
 Matumbi language
 NRK P13, a Norwegian radio station
 Papyrus 13, a biblical manuscript
 Pattern 1913 Enfield, a rifle
 Puente 13, a street gang in La Puente, California
 P13, a film rating in Malaysia

See also
 13P (disambiguation)